Hage Gottfried Geingob (born 3 August 1941) is a Namibian politician, serving as the third president of Namibia since 21 March 2015. Geingob was the first Prime Minister of Namibia from 1990 to 2002, and served as prime minister again from 2012 to 2015. Between 2008 and 2012 Geingob served as Minister of Trade and Industry. He is also the current president of the ruling SWAPO Party since his election to the position in November 2017.

In November 2014, Geingob was elected president of Namibia by an overwhelming margin. In November 2017, Geingob became the third president of SWAPO after winning by large margin at the party's 6th Congress.
In August 2018, Geingob began a one-year term as chairperson of the Southern African Development Community.

Early life 
Geingob was born in Otjiwarongo, South West Africa (present day Namibia), in 1941. He received his early education at Otavi in South West Africa under the Bantu Education System. He joined the Augustineum, where most of today's prominent political leaders of Namibia were educated, in 1958. In 1960, he was expelled from Augustineum for having participated in a march in protest at the poor quality of education. He was, however, readmitted and finished the teacher-training course in 1961. Subsequently, he took up a teaching position at the Tsumeb Primary School in Central Namibia, but decided that he could not continue his own further education in Namibia. As a teacher, he also resented being forced to participate in the Bantu Education System.

Therefore, at the end of the school year, he left his job to seek knowledge and instruction that could help him change the system. He and three of his colleagues walked and hitchhiked to Botswana to escape the system. From Botswana, he was scheduled to go to Dar es Salaam, Tanzania, on a plane chartered by the African National Congress (ANC), but the plane was blown up by South Africans. However, the bomb that was planted on the plane went off prematurely, before the plane was able to take off. Subsequently, the apartheid regime also tightened up the "underground railway". As a result, Geingob stayed in Botswana, where he served as Assistant South West Africa People's Organization (SWAPO) Representative (1963–64).

University years
In 1964 Geingob left for the United States to study at Temple University in Philadelphia, Pennsylvania, where he was granted a scholarship. Subsequently, he obtained a BA degree from Fordham University in New York City in 1970 and an MA degree in International Relations from the Graduate Faculty of The New School, New York in 1974.

In 1964, he was appointed SWAPO Representative at the United Nations and to the Americas. He served in this position until 1971. He travelled extensively, criss-crossing the United States, talking with people, and addressing gatherings. He and his colleagues were not always successful, but ultimately the United Nations General Assembly recognised SWAPO as the sole and authentic representative of the people of Namibia. Namibians' struggle at the international fora, and their armed struggle launched in 1966, eventually led to the independence of Namibia in 1990.

Career as politician and educationist
In 1972 Geingob was appointed to the United Nations Secretariat as political affairs officer, a position he held until 1975, when he was appointed director of the United Nations Institute for Namibia. He and his team were responsible for starting the institute, whose primary function was to train cadres who could take over the civil service of Namibia upon independence. Another important component of the institute was to carry out sectoral research to develop a policy framework for the government of independent Namibia. Over the years, it grew in stature and institutional relations were established with various institutions of higher learning in Europe, including the University of Warwick, University of East Anglia, and University of Sussex. These and other institutions recognized the institute's diploma and admitted its graduates for further studies.

Geingob was director of the United Nations Institute for Namibia until 1989. At the same time, he continued to be a member of both the Central Committee and the Politburo of SWAPO.

In 1989, he was elected by the Politburo of SWAPO to spearhead SWAPO's election campaign in Namibia. To carry out this assignment, he returned to Namibia with many of his colleagues on 18 June 1989, after 27 years' absence from the country. As SWAPO's Director of Elections, Geingob, along with other members of his directorate, established SWAPO election centres throughout the country and spearheaded an election campaign that brought SWAPO to power in Namibia.

On 21 November 1989, subsequent to the elections, he was elected chairman of the Constituent Assembly, which was responsible for formulating the Namibian Constitution. But before a constitution could be formulated, he had to ensure that the Constituent Assembly went through a process of confidence building between the people, who were known for their hatred of each other. Subsequently, national reconciliation became government policy. Under Geingob's chairmanship, the Constituent Assembly unanimously adopted the Namibian Constitution on 9 February 1990.

On 21 March 1990, Geingob was sworn in as the first Prime Minister of the Republic of Namibia, and on 21 March 1995, he was sworn in for a second term. He served in this capacity for 12 years. As prime minister Geingob introduced modern management approaches to the government; he was also committed to nature conservation coupled with tourism, and in the early 1990s opened the Ongava Lodge, just south of Etosha National Park.

In a cabinet reshuffle on 27 August 2002, Geingob was replaced as prime minister by Theo-Ben Gurirab and appointed Minister of Regional and Local Government and Housing, but declined to accept this lesser position.  He had placed ninth, with 368 votes, in the election to the central committee of SWAPO at the party's August 2002 congress, but on 15 September, he failed to be reelected to the SWAPO politburo; he received 33 votes from the 83-member central committee, while the lowest scoring successful candidate received 35 votes.

In 2003 Geingob was invited to be Executive Secretary of the Global Coalition for Africa based in Washington, D.C. The Global Coalition for Africa is an intergovernmental forum that brings together top African policymakers and their partners in the international community to build consensus on Africa's priority development issues. It is based on the premise that Africa can grow only from within, but to do so it needs outside support. His focus was to work with African continental and regional organizations and Africa's development partners toward conflict resolution in Africa, promotion of good governance in African states, and integration of African economies in the global economy.

In the nomination of SWAPO parliamentary candidates by party delegates on 2 October 2004, Geingob, at the time still in Washington working for the Global Coalition for Africa, placed 28th out of 60. He then left the Global Coalition for Africa and returned to Namibia to participate in the November 2004 parliamentary election, in which he won a seat.

Geingob became the party Chief Whip of SWAPO in the National Assembly on 18 April 2007. He was brought back into the SWAPO politburo in mid-2007, filling one of two vacancies. In November 2007, a few weeks before a party congress, the politburo named Geingob its sole candidate for the position of vice-president of SWAPO. At the congress, he was accordingly elected without opposition on November 29, 2007 and appointed Minister of Trade and Industry on 8 April 2008.

At SWAPO's 2012 party congress, Geingob was reelected as vice-president on 2 December, a result considered likely to make him the successor of Hifikepunye Pohamba as president of Namibia in 2015. Geingob received 312 votes from the delegates, while Jerry Ekandjo received 220 and Pendukeni Iivula-Ithana 64.  Following the congress, Pohamba appointed Geingob prime minister on 4 December 2012.

As the SWAPO candidate, Geingob was elected President of Namibia by an overwhelming margin on 28 November 2014, receiving 87% of the vote. He was sworn in as president on 21 March 2015; the ceremony was attended by 15 regional Heads of State and Government. Following his inauguration he appointed several young people including Emma Theofelus, Patience Masua and Daisry Mathias In November 2019 Geingob was reelected with 56.3% of the vote.

While speaking to newspaper The Namibian in December 2016, he dared the United States to join the International Criminal Court to reassure the court is not particularly targeting Africans.

He is the current chairperson of SADC after being elected to the position in 2018.

In April 2021, the Organised Crime and Corruption Reporting Project and The Namibian reported that Geingob was involved in the Fishrot scandal by allegedly instructing a government official to divert funds from a state-run fishing company to bribe attendees of the 2017 SWAPO electoral congress to vote for him.

Personal life
Geingob is known to be a die-hard football fan and has attended many high-profile games. He also regularly attends the Namibia Annual Music Awards (NAMAs), and in his youth sang in a choir, and played in a band.

In 1967 Geingob married Priscilla Charlene Cash, a New York City native; the couple had one daughter, Nangula Geingos-Dukes. Geingob later married Loini Kandume, a businesswoman, on 11 September 1993, in Windhoek, in a high-profile marriage which resulted in two children: a daughter and a son. Geingob initiated divorce proceedings against Kandume in May 2006, and he was granted a provisional divorce order in July 2008. Geingob married Monica Kalondo on February 14, 2015. Hage Geingob Rugby Stadium and the University of Namibia's Medical School Campus both in Windhoek are named after him.

Awards, honours and recognition
 In 1980, awarded the Palmes Academiques (Officer Class) by the French Government in recognition of valuable services in education. 
 In 1987, awarded Omugulugwombashe Medal (SWAPO) for bravery and long service. 
 In 1994, awarded LL.D. Honoris Causa by Columbia College, Illinois. 
 In 1994, awarded the second highest order in Cuba, Carlos Manuel de Céspedes.
 In 1994, awarded the Order of the Sun, 1st Class by the Government of Namibia for providing outstanding political leadership.  
 In 1995, awarded LL.D. (Doctorate of Laws) Honoris Causa by the University of Delhi, India.
 In 1997, awarded LL.D. (Doctorate of Laws) Honoris Causa by the University of Namibia.
 In 1998, awarded Doctorate of Humane Letters (Honoris Causa) by The American University of Rome.
In 2001, a new school aimed at educating deprived children was opened in Katutura and named after the president. The Hage G. Geingob High School educates many from the informal settlements around Windhoek. 
 In 2015, was conferred the Order of the Most Ancient Welwitschia Mirabilis by then-President Hifikepunye Pohamba, upon Geingob's inauguration as Namibia's third President on 21 March 2015

Research activities and publications
Hage Geingob received his Ph.D. from the University of Leeds. His thesis was entitled "State Formation in Namibia: Promoting Democracy and Good Governance". In his thesis, he examined significant events in the process of state formation in Namibia and provided an insight into the role played by various actors involved in shaping the evolution of Namibia as a state. He also examined the efforts of Namibians to build a reconciled society out of ethnically and racially stratified, diverse and often antagonistic groups, to promote democracy and a policy of reconciliation, to improve the life condition of the previously disadvantaged groups through affirmative action, to encourage good governance, to promote a culture of human rights, and to build state institutions to support these policies. Finally, he carried out a democratic audit of Namibia.

As the director of the Institute for Namibia and as the chairman of the Research Coordinating Committee, Hage Geingob oversaw all research activities at the United Nations Institute for Namibia. The result of this effort resulted in 22 published research studies.

He was also the chairman of the most comprehensive study ever undertaken on Namibia, Namibia: Perspectives for National Reconstruction and Development, which was undertaken by the United Nations Institute for Namibia in pursuance of the mandate given to it by the United Nations General Assembly. This study covered all aspects of socio-economic reconstruction and development for independent Namibia. This study came to be known as the "Blue Bible", referring to the colour of its cover, among the researchers and planners of Namibia. Indeed, this study provided the blueprint for setting up the new government in independent Namibia.

In addition, Hage Geingob has contributed numerous articles to various publications, including monographs, periodicals and newspapers.

He has travelled extensively covering all the continents and has attended, chaired, and presented papers at numerous UN and other international conferences. He also regularly attended the General Assembly sessions from 1965 to 1985.

References

External links
 Official Twitter

|-

|-

|-

|-

|-

1941 births
Alumni of the University of Leeds
Damara people
Fordham University alumni
Namibian Lutherans
Living people
Members of the National Assembly (Namibia)
Namibian expatriates in the United States
Namibian expatriates in Zambia
Officiers of the Ordre des Palmes Académiques
People from Otjiwarongo
Presidents of Namibia
Prime Ministers of Namibia
Trade and industry ministers of Namibia
SWAPO politicians
The New School alumni
Augustineum Secondary School alumni